The term epidural  (from Ancient Greek ἐπί, "on, upon" + dura mater) is an adjective referring to the epidural space, part of the spinal canal in mammals. The term is most commonly used to refer to epidural administration of analgesics and anesthetics.

It may also refer to:

Anatomy
 Epidural administration
 Epidural space
 Epidural venous plexus

Anaesthesia
 Epidural needle (Tuohy needle)

 Epidural blood patch
 Caudal epidural
 Combined spinal and epidural anaesthesia (CSE)
 Epidural steroid injection
 Patient-controlled epidural analgesia (PCEA)

Pathology
 Epidural abscess
 Epidural haematoma